MCFA may refer to:

 Marie Curie Fellows Association, association of recipients of a Marie Curie research grant from the Marie Curie Actions programme or the People programme
 Medium-chain fatty acid, a fatty acid with an aliphatic tail of 6–12 carbon atoms